The 1983 Lilian Cup was the 2nd season of the competition. The four top placed teams for the previous season took part in the competition.

The competition was held in two stages. First, the four teams played a round-robin tournament, after which the two top teams played for the cup, while the bottom teams played for the third place. The competition was held between 3 September and 13 September 1983.

The competition was won by Maccabi Netanya, who had beaten Hapoel Be'er Sheva 3–2 in the final.

Group stage
The matches were played from 3 September to 10 September 1983.

Final stage

3rd-4th Place Match

Final

References

Lilian 1983
Lilian Cup